Hawley is a city in Jones County, Texas, United States. The population was 634 at the 2010 census. Named for Congressman Robert B. Hawley, it is part of the Abilene metropolitan area.

Geography

Hawley is located in southeastern Jones County at  (32.612023, –99.813315). U.S. Routes 83 and 277, running concurrently, pass through the southwest side of the city, leading northwest  to Anson, the county seat, and southeast  to Abilene.

The Clear Fork of the Brazos River flows through the city, south of the center.

Demographics

2020 census

As of the 2020 United States census, there were 545 people, 253 households, and 130 families residing in the city.

2000 census
As of the census of 2000,  646 people, 239 households, and 184 families resided in the city. The population density was 219.7 people per square mile (84.8/km). The 264 housing units averaged 89.8/sq mi (34.7/km). The racial makeup of the city was 96.44% White, 0.15% African American, 0.93% Asian, 1.70% from other races, and 0.77% from two or more races. Hispanics or Latinos of any race were 4.18% of the population.

Of the 239 households, 39.3% had children under the age of 18 living with them, 63.6% were married couples living together, 9.2% had a female householder with no husband present, and 22.6% were not families. About 20.1% of all households were made up of individuals, and 10.9% had someone living alone who was 65 years of age or older. The average household size was 2.70 and the average family size was 3.11.

In the city, the population was distributed as 30.7% under the age of 18, 7.3% from 18 to 24, 28.5% from 25 to 44, 22.3% from 45 to 64, and 11.3% who were 65 years of age or older. The median age was 34 years. For every 100 females there were 96.4 males. For every 100 females age 18 and over, there were 94.8 males.

Males had a median income of $25,893 versus $21,071 for females. The per capita income for the city was $14,879. About 9.3% of families and 13.0% of the population were below the poverty line, including 18.8% of those under age 18 and 15.9% of those age 65 or over.

Education
The city is served by the Hawley Independent School District.

Climate
The climate in this area is characterized by hot, dry summers and generally mild to cool winters. According to the Köppen climate classification system, Hawley has a humid subtropical climate, Cfa on climate maps.

References

Cities in Texas
Cities in Jones County, Texas
Cities in the Abilene metropolitan area